Never Gonna Let You Down may refer to:
 "Never Gonna Let You Down" (Surface song), 1990
 "Never Gonna Let You Down" (Colbie Caillat song), 2014
 Never Gonna Give You Up, the song's chorus lyrics have Never Gonna Let You Down in the second line